East Williston  is the first station along the Oyster Bay Branch of the Long Island Rail Road, at Hillside Avenue and Pennsylvania Avenue in East Williston, New York. Electric third rail territory ends just north of the station, but all service is provided by diesel bi-level trains.

History
East Williston's station house opened in February 1880 by the Glen Cove Branch Rail Road. It originally contained a freight house and wooden platform shelters that were closed during the mid-20th Century. The third rail was installed from Mineola to East Williston in June 1934 because there were originally plans to electrify the entire Oyster Bay Branch, however this did not occur. It was also a convenient, less-busy location to turn back electric trains to Mineola, a service since made redundant by subsequent extensions of the electrification to Hicksville and beyond.

The canopies surrounding the station house began to sag by 1960, and the LIRR considered closing it along with Albertson station, and combining the two stations in between the current existing ones. However, after a great deal of community opposition, those plans were shelved, and East Williston's canopies were restored between 1965 and 1966. High level platforms were added in December 1982. These projects did little to keep the station house in stable condition, and it was closed on December 10, 1996. Since then, it has operated as little more than a pair of sheltered high-level platforms with ticket vending machines and handicapped access ramps. Efforts to preserve the original station house failed when it was found to be too structurally unstable, and it was razed on December 11, 2004. Some in the community have been considering building a whole new version of the original station house, but have instead opted for a decorative open-air shelter.

Station layout
The station has two high-level side platforms, each 10 cars long.

References

External links
 

Unofficial LIRR History Website
July 1993 Photo
June 2006: What currently passes for East Williston Station
Sam Berliner III's Long Island Railroad page
1999 Former East Williston Station Photos (Victorian Stations of the LIRR)
The End of East Williston Station
 Station from Google Maps Street View
Platforms from Google Maps Street View
The decorative shelter from Google Maps Street View

Long Island Rail Road stations in Nassau County, New York
Railway stations in the United States opened in 1880
1880 establishments in New York (state)